The twentieth season of the One Piece anime series was produced by Toei Animation, directed by Tatsuya Nagamine and Satoshi Ito. The season began broadcasting in Japan on Fuji Television on July 7, 2019. On April 19, 2020, Toei Animation announced that the series would be delayed due to the ongoing COVID-19 pandemic. They later scheduled the series' return for June 28, 2020, resuming from episode 930. On March 10, 2022, it was announced that the series would be delayed until further notice due to Toei Animation's network being hacked on March 6, 2022. On April 5, 2022, it was announced that the series would return on April 17, 2022, with the airing of episode 1014.

Like the rest of the series, this season follows the adventures of Monkey D. Luffy and his Straw Hat Pirates. The main story arc, called "Wano Country", adapts material from the rest of the 90th volume onwards. It deals with the alliance between the pirates, samurai, and minks to liberate Wano Country from the corrupt shogun Kurozumi Orochi, who has allied with the Beast Pirates led by one of the Four Emperors, Kaido. Episodes 895 and 896 contain an original story arc, "Cidre Guild" which ties into the film One Piece: Stampede. Episode 907 is an adaptation of Oda's one-shot manga Romance Dawn, which features "the story of a Luffy slightly different from the one in One Piece". Episodes 1029 and 1030 constitute a One Piece Film: Red tie-in making up the “Uta’s Past” arc, taking place over a decade before the present and following Luffy's childhood interactions with Uta, the adoptive daughter of "Red Haired" Shanks.

Five pieces of theme music are used for this season. From episodes 935 to 999 and 1001 to 1004, the second opening theme is "Dreamin' On" by Da-ice. For episode 1000, the special opening theme is "We Are!" by Hiroshi Kitadani. From episodes 1005–1027 and 1031 onward, the fourth opening theme is "Paint" by I Don't Like Mondays. From episodes 1028–1030 and SP–4, in the Japanese broadcast only due to licensing issues and to promote Film: Red, the special opening theme is the theme song of the afterformentioned film,  by Ado, the vocalist of the character from the afterformentioned film, Uta.



Episode list

Home releases

Japanese

English

Notes

References 
General

Specific

2019 Japanese television seasons
2020 Japanese television seasons
2021 Japanese television seasons
2022 Japanese television seasons
2023 Japanese television seasons
One Piece seasons
Anime postponed due to the COVID-19 pandemic
Anime productions suspended due to the COVID-19 pandemic
One Piece episodes